Aló Ciudadano was a Venezuelan talk show hosted by Leopoldo Castillo as the opposition counterpart of Aló Presidente launched by Hugo Chávez government in 1999. It was aired both on the Globovisión 24-hour television news network and Radio Caracas Radio (RCR) network until 2013.

Format 

Aló Ciudadano was hosted by Leopoldo Castillo and co-hosted by journalist Sheila Chang Montero, Maria Alejandra Trujillo and Pedro Pablo Peñaloza.

The show was interactive; people were able to call the show and give their opinions and/or complaints or they could send text messages, which appeared on the news ticker. Leopoldo Castillo conducted interviews and he usually discussed politics.

Leopoldo Castillo began his show saying "Ciudadanos de la República Bolivariana de Venezuela" ("citizens of the Bolivarian Republic of Venezuela"). During the show, Sheina Chang read news headlines from the main news websites of Venezuela and Latin America, and conducted interviews along with Castillo.

Although Aló Ciudadano opposed Chávez's government, they invited numerous pro-Chávez people on his show, such as the former mayor of the Libertador municipality, Freddy Bernal.

History
The show began airing in late 2002, and was originally hosted by Leopoldo Castillo and co-hosted by Carlos Acosta and Marjorie Martínez. It was the most popular opinion program for the Venezuelan political opposition to Hugo Chávez and Nicolas Maduro governments. While in Venezuela many newspapers, radio stations, television broadcasting companies, and websites which are in majority opposed to the government are closing down, Aló Ciudadano was one of the few broadcasts (mainly in Globovision) that were not owed by or affiliated to the Venezuelan government. The show revived in 2016 as "El Ciudadano" on MiraTV. The show followed the same format, however it ran 1 hour Monday-Friday instead of 3 hours like its predecessor. The show debuted in July 2016 and ended in December 2016 and was viewable on television and YouTube. It is believed that the show has been quietly cancelled for unknown reasons, yet Leopoldo Castillo hasn't made an official announcement for the show's 2017 scheduling.

Hosts

See also
Globovisión

References

External links
CNB's official website
Aló Ciudadano's official website

2002 Venezuelan television series debuts
Globovisión original programming
Venezuelan television news shows
2013 Venezuelan television series endings